The Union for Progress (Union pour le Progrès) is a political party in Saint Martin, led by Louis Constant-Fleming. It won in the  1 July and 8 July 2007 Territorial Council elections 16 out of 23 seats.

Political parties in the Collectivity of Saint Martin